William Christy Cabanne (April 16, 1888 – October 15, 1950) was an American film director, screenwriter, and silent film actor.

Biography
Born in 1888, Cabanne (pronounced CAB-a-nay) started his career on stage as an actor and director. He appeared on-screen in dozens of short films from 1911 to 1915. He became a film director and one of the more prolific directors of his time. He signed with the Fine Arts Film Company and was employed as an assistant to D.W. Griffith. Miriam Cooper credited him with discovering her as an extra in 1912. Cabanne directed child actress Shirley Temple in The Red-Haired Alibi (1932) in her first credited role in a feature movie.

Cabanne earned a reputation for efficiency, capable of making feature films very quickly, often on rugged locations. Like fellow silent-era directors William Beaudine, Elmer Clifton, Harry Fraser, and Lambert Hillyer, Cabanne was resourceful, and he worked for both major and minor studios through the 1930s and 1940s. By the f1940s, Cabanne usually given low-budget action fare at Universal Pictures, and he finished his career making lower-budget westerns for Monogram Pictures.

Personal life
Christy Cabanne was married to Millicent Fisher. They had two children, William and Audrey. William has two children, William Christy Jr. and Melinda. Audrey married Bill Davisson and they have two children, Monica and Danielle.

Partial filmography

 The Battle (1911)
 The Musketeers of Pig Alley (1912)
 For His Son (1912)
 The Transformation of Mike (1912)
 Under Burning Skies (1912)
 The Goddess of Sagebrush Gulch (1912)
 The Punishment (1912)
 Just Like a Woman (1912)
 A Temporary Truce (1912)
 The Inner Circle (1912)
 Two Daughters of Eve (1912)
 So Near, Yet So Far (1912)
 The Painted Lady (1912)
 Heredity (1912)
 The Informer (1912)
 My Hero (1912)
 A Cry for Help (1912)
 The God Within (1912)
 A Chance Deception (1913)
 Near to Earth (1913)
 A Misunderstood Boy (1913)
 The House of Darkness (1913)
 The Wanderer (1913)
 A Timely Interception (1913)
 The Mothering Heart (1913)
 The Sorrowful Shore (1913)
 By Man's Law (1913)
 During the Round-Up (1913)
 An Indian's Loyalty (1913)
 So Runs the Way (1913)
 The Conscience of Hassan Bey (1913)
 The Yaqui Cur (1913)
 Almost a Wild Man (1913)
 The Dishonored Medal (1914)
 Judith of Bethulia (1914) (actor)
 The Hunchback (1914)
 The Quicksands (1914)
 The Rebellion of Kitty Belle (1914)
 The Sisters (1914)
 The Great Leap; Until Death Do Us Part (1914)
 The Life of General Villa (1914)
 The Lost House (1915)
 Martyrs of the Alamo (1915)
 The Outlaw's Revenge (1915)
 Enoch Arden (1915)
 The Absentee (1915)
 The Failure (1915)
 Pathways of Life (1916)
 Daphne and the Pirate (1916)
 Sold for Marriage (1916)
 Diane of the Follies (1916)
 National Red Cross Pageant (1917)
 Draft 258 (1917)
 Miss Robinson Crusoe (1917)
 Cyclone Higgins, D.D. (1918)
 The Mayor of Filbert (1919)
 The Pest (1919)
 The Beloved Cheater (1919)
 Fighting Through (1919)
 God's Outlaw (1919)
 A Regular Fellow (1919)
 Burnt Wings (1920)
 The Triflers (1920)
 The Barricade (1921)
 What's a Wife Worth? (1921)
 Live and Let Live
 At the Stage Door (1921)
 Beyond the Rainbow (1922)
 Till We Meet Again (1922)
 The Spitfire (1924)
 Youth for Sale (1924)
 Is Love Everything? (1924)
 The Average Woman (1924)
 Lend Me Your Husband (1924)
 The Midshipman (1925)
 The Masked Bride (1925)
 Altars of Desire (1927)
 Nameless Men (1928)
 Driftwood (1928)
 Restless Youth (1928)
 The Dawn Trail (1930)
 Sky Raiders (1931)
 Graft (1931)
 Carne de Cabaret (1931)
 The Red-Haired Alibi (1932)
 Western Limited (1932)
 Hearts of Humanity (1932)
 The Unwritten Law (1932)
 Midnight Patrol (1932)
 The World Gone Mad (1933)
 Daring Daughters (1933)
 Jane Eyre (1934)
 A Girl of the Limberlost (1934)
 Money Means Nothing (1934)
 Behind the Green Lights (1935)
 Storm Over the Andes (1935)
 The Keeper of the Bees (1935)
 Another Face (1935)
 It's Up to You (1936)
 The Outcasts of Poker Flat (1937)
 Annapolis Salute (1937)
 The Westland Case (1937)
 Everybody's Doing It (1938)
 Night Spot (1938)
 Smashing the Spy Ring (1938)
 Mutiny on the Blackhawk (1939)
 Legion of Lost Flyers (1939)
 Man from Montreal (1939)
 The Mummy's Hand (1940)
 Black Diamonds (1940)
 Danger on Wheels (1940)
 Hot Steel (1940)
 The Devil's Pipeline (1940)
 Scattergood Baines (1941)
 Timber (1942)
 Drums of the Congo (1942)
 Keep 'Em Slugging (1943)
 Scared to Death (1944, released 1947)
 The Man Who Walked Alone (1945)
 Sensation Hunters (1945)
 Robin Hood of Monterey (1947)
 King of the Bandits (1947)
 Silver Trails (1948)
 Back Trail (1948)

References

External links and sources

1888 births
1950 deaths
American male film actors
American male silent film actors
American male screenwriters
Male actors from St. Louis
United States Naval Academy alumni
Film directors from Missouri
20th-century American male actors
Burials at Forest Lawn Memorial Park (Glendale)
Articles containing video clips
Screenwriters from Missouri
20th-century American male writers
20th-century American screenwriters